Tamás Grúz (born 8 November 1985 in Salgótarján) is a Hungarian football player who currently plays for Unione FC.

References

External links

Player profile at HLSZ 

1985 births
Living people
People from Salgótarján
Hungarian footballers
Association football midfielders
Salgótarjáni BTC footballers
Békéscsaba 1912 Előre footballers
Szolnoki MÁV FC footballers
Kaposvári Rákóczi FC players
Ferencvárosi TC footballers
Vasas SC players
Nemzeti Bajnokság I players
Sportspeople from Nógrád County